Graham Central Station was an American funk band named after founder Larry Graham (formerly of Sly and the Family Stone). The name is a pun on New York City's Grand Central Terminal, often colloquially called Grand Central Station.

History

Origins
The band's origins date from when Santana guitarist Neal Schon formed the band Azteca in 1972 along with Larry Graham (bass guitar) and Gregg Errico (drums), both from Sly and the Family Stone, and Pete Sears (keyboards), from Hot Tuna and Jefferson Starship. Santana bass guitar player Tom Rutley moved into the bass spot with Azteca. That band, like Santana with heavy Latin influences, eventually morphed into Graham Central Station, while Schon formed Journey. The invention of electric slap bass is attributed by many (including Victor Wooten and Bootsy Collins) to Graham, which influenced many musical genres, such as funk, R&B and disco.

Highlights
In 1974, they released the single "Can You Handle It?". It peaked at number 9 on the R&B charts and number 49 on the Billboard Hot 100. Graham Central Station's biggest hit was "Your Love", which charted at number 1 on the R&B charts in 1975. The same year they issued a cover version of the Detroit Emeralds 1972 hit "Feel the Need in Me". It reached number 18 on the R&B charts and this would be the bands only hit in the UK peaking at number 53. The group also integrated gospel music into their repertoire, and played with the dichotomy between the funk/rock star image and the "sanctified" gospel group image. Some of their recordings feature the Tower of Power horn section.

In 2011, Graham Central Station opened for Prince on Prince's "Welcome 2 America" tour.

Members

 Larry Graham – vocals, bass, guitar, clavinet, organ, piano, drums, percussion
 Lenny Williams – vocals
 Patryce Banks – vocals, electric funk box (Maestro Rhythm King), tambourine
 Ashling Cole – vocals, electric funk box (Maestro Rhythm King)
 Tina Graham – vocals, electric funk box (Maestro Rhythm King)
 David Vega – vocals, guitar
 Gail Muldrow – vocals, guitar, electric funk box
 George Johnson – vocals, guitar
 Wilton Rabb – guitar
 Freddie Stone – guitar
 Gemi Taylor – guitar
 Hershall Kennedy – vocals, clavinet, trumpet
 Robert "Butch" Sam – vocals, piano, organ
 David Council – vocals, keyboards
 Jimi McKinney Jr. – vocals, keyboards
 Rose Stone – vocals, organ, electric funk box
 Cynthia Robinson – trumpet
 P. CaboOse – tenor saxophone
 Jerry Martini – saxophone
 Dennis Marcellino – saxophone
 Willie Sparks – vocals, drums
 Manuel Kellough – drums
 Noel T. Closson – drums
 Gaylord Birch – drums
 Brian Braziel – drums
 Milt Holland – percussion

Discography

Studio albums

Live albums
 Live in Japan '92''' (1992) Star Maker – manufactured by PIA Corporation & Edoya Records Inc. (Tokyo, Japan)
 Live in London (1996) – Funk24 (London, England)
 Can You Handle This? (2003) – Kezar Stadium – 1975, Big Fro Discs (Japan)

Compilation albums
 The Best of Larry Graham and Graham Central Station, Vol. 1 (Warner Bros, 1996)
 The Jam: The Larry Graham & Graham Central Station Anthology (Rhino, 2001)
 Greatest Hits (Rhino Flashback, 2003)

Singles

References

External links
 Review of Mirror at Crawdaddy!''
 
 Gail Muldrow Interview NAMM Oral History Library (2020)

American soul musical groups
American funk musical groups
Rock music groups from California
Musical groups established in 1972
Musical groups from San Francisco